Skull Mountain is an enclosed roller coaster located at Six Flags Great Adventure in Jackson Township, New Jersey. Designed and manufactured by Intamin, the ride opened to the public on June 3, 1996.

Ride experience
After ascending the first lift hill, the train travels around the front facade of the enclosure to ascend the second lift hill. The first drop is the ride's only steep drop, while the rest of the ride contains three horizontal helices.

The building is punctuated by strobe lights and sound effects play over a tribal or heavy metal music score. 
Occasionally, ride operators will operate Skull Mountain with the interior lights illuminated. On hot summer days, the park turns on the ride's exterior waterfall, which falls from the exterior skull's eyes. It pours down into the water below, wetting guests in the ride's queue.

While most of the park's coasters (except Kingda Ka) will operate in light rain, Skull Mountain remains open during thunderstorms, since it is enclosed. It will be closed only if the thunderstorm is severe.

Skull Mountain was opened in 1996 and is one of three roller coasters at the park with a  height requirement and requires a child to be accompanied by an adult (effective since 2012). To ride alone, guests must be .

A flume boat ride of a similar name, Skull Mountain at Six Flags America near Baltimore, Maryland, closed in July 2011 to make room for Apocalypse, later known as Firebird.

Ride Overlays
Fright Fest

The only Additions during the Fright Fest event are a few pumpkin figures and the atmospheric lighting is turned off.

Holiday in the Park

During the first three seasons of "Holiday in the park", the Six Flags Great Adventure holiday event, the ride's name was changed temporarily to "Poinsettia Peak". The ride received a new sign and the exterior of the attraction was decorated in strands of red string lights.

During the 2018 season of "Holiday in the park", this overlay was not seen. Although, the name of the area surrounding it was named "Poinsettia Peak". 

The only remaining theming from this addition in the 2018 season are a few red flood lights pointed at the attraction.

References

Roller coasters in New Jersey
Six Flags Great Adventure
Roller coasters operated by Six Flags
1996 establishments in New Jersey